"Rise" is a song by American singer Katy Perry. She co-wrote the song with Savan Kotecha and its producers Max Martin and  Ali Payami. Capitol Records first released it on July 14, 2016, as a standalone single, and Katy Perry’s first single in almost two years. "Rise" is a mid-tempo electronic song with lyrical themes of victory and rising above one's opponents. After an Olympics-themed promotional video was released the following day, an official music video debuted on August 4, 2016.

Commercially, the song reached number one in Australia, the top ten in the Czech Republic, France, Hungary, Scotland, and Spain, the top twenty in Argentina, Canada, Lebanon, Switzerland, and the United States, and the top thirty in Austria, New Zealand, and the United Kingdom.

Production and release
NBC Sports announced upon the release of "Rise" that it would be prominently featured during its US television coverage of the 2016 Summer Olympics. Perry stated that the track is "a song that's brewing inside me for years, that has finally come to the surface", and wanted to release it as a standalone track instead of including it on an album "because now more than ever, there is a need for our world to unite", referring to the 2016 Nice terrorist attack. Half of the song had previously been written prior to the Olympics, but was not completed because she felt "it didn't come out right". Perry further added:
I can't think of a better example than the Olympic athletes, as they gather in Rio with their strength and fearlessness, to remind us how we ALL can come together, with the resolve to be the best we can be. I hope this song can inspire us to heal, unite, and rise together. I am honored that NBC Olympics has chosen to use ['Rise'] as an anthem before and during the Rio Games.

NBC felt its message spoke "directly to the spirit of the Olympics and its athletes" for its inspirational themes. It was released as a single on July 14, 2016, for streaming on Apple Music and for download on iTunes.

Composition

Perry co-wrote "Rise" with Savan Kotecha and its producers Max Martin and Ali Payami. It is a mid-tempo electronic song about victory and rising above opponents. Sophie Gilbert of The Atlantic wrote the song is "a languid anthem of determination that uses an echo machine and aggressive use of metaphor to evoke icons as diverse as Katniss Everdeen, Maya Angelou, and Jesus." BenI Ratliff of The New York Times called it a "slow-footed" song. In a review for Entertainment Weekly, Kevin O'Donell noted that the song "starts with brooding atmospherics and minor-key synths before exploding into a huge chorus".

The song is three minutes and twenty-three seconds long. It is written in the key of E minor with a common time tempo of 101.5 beats per minute. Perry's vocals span from C4 to E5 in the song.

Critical reception
Daniel Kreps of Rolling Stone described the song as "a galvanic sequel" to "Roar". Marissa Payne from The Washington Post wrote: "Sure, it's a bit of a slow jam, but the uplifting lyrics to 'Rise' are pretty solid." The song received a mixed response from The New York Times journalists Jon Pareles, Ben Ratliff and Jon Caramanica who deemed the song "limp", writing they feel "psyched" and "uneasy". It received an average score of 5.7/10 from Idolators critics. Kevin O'Donell of Entertainment Weekly gave the song a B+.

Chris Ingalls from PopMatters described the song's nature as an "emotional delivery", and felt it worked nicely for the Olympics. Clarisse Loughrey from The Independent deemed it as "power anthem mode".

Chart performance
In the United Kingdom, "Rise" became Perry's 20th entry in the UK Singles Chart top 75, when it debuted and peaked at number 25 on the chart dated 22 July 2016, with first week sales of 22,497 copies. It became the 1055th number-one song in Australia, and the second song to debut atop the ARIA Singles Chart in 2016 following "Pillowtalk" by Zayn Malik. Perry's accumulated weeks at number-one atop the chart equaled to fourteen, placing her at fifth position on the list of artist with most number-ones in the 2010s. It also became her fourth number-one in the nation after "I Kissed a Girl", "California Gurls", and "Roar", and was certified Gold by the Australian Recording Industry Association for shipments of 35,000 units.

In the United States, "Rise" debuted and peaked at number 11 on the Billboard Hot 100, for the chart of August 6, 2016. It became Perry's 24th Hot 100 entry and her third-highest debut at the time behind "Part of Me" (number one) and "California Gurls" featuring Snoop Dogg (number two). It is also her first entry on the Hot 100 since 2014's "This Is How We Do". Additionally, with "Rise" debuting at number one on the Digital Songs chart with first-week sales of 137,000 downloads, Perry achieved her 11th number one on the chart, surpassing Taylor Swift who had amassed 10 number-ones. "Rise" also debuted at number 22 on the Adult Contemporary, number 24 on the Adult Pop Songs and number 33 on the Mainstream Top 40 charts. The song descended down the charts to number 43 for the next two weeks before ascending back to number 29 following the music video's release. "Rise" achieved 6.7 million US streams leading to a debut of number 42 on Streaming Songs chart, 27 million radio audience leading to a debut of number 47 on Radio Songs chart, and ascending the Digital Songs chart from 20–10 with a 24% increase in sales (47,000 copies). On the issue dated October 22, 2016, "Rise" reached number one on the Dance Club Songs, becoming Perry's sixteenth consecutive number-one on the chart. In October 2017, it was certified Platinum by the Recording Industry Association of America for shipments of 1 million units.

Promotion and music video

A promotional video directed by Joseph Lee was released on July 15, 2016, featuring scenes of athletes from past Olympics. Daniel Kreps of Rolling Stone wrote that the video is "a riveting montage of memorable moments and athletes from Olympics' past". Billboard Gil Kaufman called the video "inspirational", saying it has a "superstar power" with the presence of famous athletes. Bleacher Report's columnist Vanessa de Beaumont described it as a "moving tribute". The A.V. Club writer Esther Zuckerman felt that the video was "incredibly corny, but surprisingly effective". Esquire contributor Matt Miller praised it as "perfect" for having "Beautiful, sweeping shots of Brazil that are HD AF".

Perry subsequently released a teaser of the official music video on July 22, 2016, showing the singer parachuting into a body of water in the middle of a desert. A second teaser was released on August 1, and also featured Perry using a parachute, and revealed that the video would be released three days later. Paul Gore directed the video, which was released on August 4 and featured in NBC's Rio Olympics Preview Special the same day. The video was filmed in Snow Canyon State Park and Sand Hollow State Park in Utah. It shows Perry struggling to get her parachute to fly while traveling through canyons and water. Mike Wass from Idolator gave the video a positive review, saying that "the execution is flawless".

On July 28, 2016, Perry performed "Rise" live at the 2016 Democratic National Convention. She then again performed the song a second time in October 2019 at Silence The Voice.

Formats and track listingsDigital download"Rise" – 3:23CD"Rise" – 3:23
"Rise" (instrumental) – 3:23Digital download (remixes)'
"Rise" (Purity Ring remix) – 3:32
"Rise" (Monsieur Adi radio edit) – 4:01
"Rise" (Tālā remix) – 3:18

Credits and personnel
Credits adapted from Qobuz.

Katy Perry – lead vocals, backing vocals, songwriter
Max Martin – producer, songwriter, backing vocals, programming, strings, trumpet
 Ali Payami – producer, songwriter, drums, electric bass, guitar, horn, keyboards, percussion, programming, strings
Savan Kotecha – songwriter
Sam Holland – recording engineer
Jeremy Lertola – assistant recording engineer
Cory Bice – assistant recording engineer
Serban Ghenea – mixer
John Hanes – mix engineer

Charts

Weekly charts

Year-end charts

Certifications

Release history

See also
List of Billboard Dance Club Songs number ones of 2016
List of number-one singles of 2016 (Australia)
List of number-one singles of 2016 (Finland)
Artists with the most number-ones on the U.S. Dance Club Songs chart

References

2016 singles
2016 songs
Capitol Records singles
Electronic songs
Katy Perry songs
Number-one singles in Australia
Olympic theme songs
Song recordings produced by Max Martin
Songs written by Katy Perry
Songs written by Max Martin